Go is a 1999 American crime comedy film written by John August and directed by Doug Liman, with intertwining plots involving three sets of characters. The film stars William Fichtner, Katie Holmes, Jay Mohr, Sarah Polley, and Scott Wolf and features Taye Diggs, Breckin Meyer, Timothy Olyphant, Desmond Askew, Jane Krakowski, J. E. Freeman, and Melissa McCarthy in her film debut.

The film underperformed at the box office, but was critically acclaimed. It has since become a cult classic.

Plot

Around Christmas, Ronna, working overtime at her supermarket job to avoid being evicted, is approached by Adam and Zack to buy 20 hits of ecstasy, which they had hoped to buy from her absent co-worker, Simon.

After work, Ronna approaches Simon's dealer, Todd, for the pills. She is unable to pay the full amount so she leaves her friend Claire with Todd as collateral. Ronna meets with Adam and Zack but grows suspicious of Burke, a stranger accompanying them who presses her for the ecstasy. She flushes the drugs down the toilet and leaves, then steals over-the-counter pills to replace them, helped by Manny, who had covertly swallowed two of the ecstasy pills, unaware of their strength. Ronna gives 20 of the fake pills to Todd. She, Claire, and Manny then go to a rave where she sells the rest of the fake pills as ecstasy.

Todd realizes the pills are fake and pursues Ronna to the rave. Ronna flees, hiding the now incapacitated Manny in an alley and promising to return with her car. Todd confronts her with a gun in the parking lot when she is hit by a car that speeds away, leaving her motionless in a ditch.

The story restarts from the perspective of Simon, who is on a trip to Las Vegas with Marcus, Tiny, and Singh. Simon crashes a wedding and has sex with two of the bridesmaids before they accidentally set their hotel room on fire. Simon and Marcus leave the hotel, stealing a Ferrari whose owner thinks Marcus is a parking valet.

The two go to a strip club where Simon enrages the bouncer, Victor Jr., by groping one of the strippers. Simon shoots Victor Jr. in the arm with a gun that he found in the car. He and Marcus flee to the hotel, rousing Tiny and Singh. A car chase ensues and the four barely escape the bouncer and his father, Victor Sr., but Victor Sr. traces Todd's address from his credit card, which Simon had borrowed.

The story changes perspective to Adam and Zack, actors in a soap opera who are in a relationship. Having been busted for drug possession, they are coerced into working for Burke, a police detective, to entrap their dealer. Adam is fitted with a wire. As Simon is absent, the two arrange to buy drugs from Ronna. When Ronna arrives later to make the deal, Zack secretly warns her so she flushes the drugs down the toilet and leaves.

After the unsuccessful bust, Burke invites Adam and Zack to Christmas dinner, where they observe strange behavior from Burke and his wife, Irene. Over dinner Burke and Irene pitch a multi-level marketing company to Adam and Zack. Discussing their mutual infidelities, Adam and Zack realize they both cheated with the same person, Jimmy. They confront him at the rave, cutting a lock of his hair.

Leaving the rave they accidentally run over Ronna, panic, and drive away when they see Todd with a gun. Zack tries to reassure Adam that, even if Ronna had survived, Todd would have shot her. Adam realizes to his horror that he is still wearing his wire. Fearing they have been recorded, the two return to the scene to remove Ronna's body but discover she is just unconscious. They prop her up on a car, setting off its alarm, and watch from a distance as other partygoers call an ambulance.

As morning breaks, Claire goes to a restaurant to meet up with Ronna and Manny, but encounters Todd instead. The two end up going to Todd's apartment building. While making out on the stairs they are confronted by the two Victors. Simon arrives, having hoped to hide for a few days. The ensuing scuffle is stopped by Claire, who refuses to witness a murder.

Simon agrees to be shot in the arm by Victor Jr. as Claire leaves in disgust. Meanwhile, Ronna wakes up in hospital and hobbles to the supermarket to start work. Realizing she left Manny at the rave, she and Claire return to the venue to find Manny pale and shaking in the alley. The three go to Ronna's car where Ronna muses that she can now pay her rent and Manny asks what their plans are for New Year's.

Cast

Production
John August originally wrote the portion of the story involving Ronna as a short film  titled X, inspired by the "Rock 'n' Roll Ralphs" grocery store on Sunset Boulevard. After friends asked about Simon's trip to Vegas, and what was going on with Adam and Zack, he wrote two more parts, accounting for the nature of the film.

After viewing Swingers, John August and the producers felt director Doug Liman would be the perfect fit, and Liman signed on soon thereafter. Polley, who resides in Canada, was offered the role directly, without auditioning. Olyphant was a late addition; he was about to shoot the film Practical Magic but was fired from his role and replaced by Aidan Quinn, enabling him to join the cast as Todd.  He was called in to audition for Adam or Zack, but all agreed he was better as drug dealer Todd, the character he wanted to play.

When Go was about to start shooting, its foreign financing fell through because the film lacked a "bankable white male star." Columbia Pictures stepped in and financed the film. As most of the plot takes place at night, August recalled being "outside in the dark from 8 p.m. until 8 a.m. for 25 days" during filming.

Reception
Go was released to critical acclaim. The film received a 91% approval rating from Rotten Tomatoes based on 74 critic reviews, with an average score of 7.6/10. The website's critical consensus reads: "With its sharp dialogue and raucous visuals, Go entertains at an exhilarating pace." On Metacritic, the film has a weighted average score of 72 out of 100, based on 29 critics, indicating "Generally favorable reviews". Many critics generally found Gos fast pace and light-hearted feel appealing. The film grossed $28.5 million worldwide against a $20 million budget. The film was released in the United Kingdom on September 3, 1999, and opened at #6.

Because of its irreverent and frequently off topic dialogue, fast pace, rapidly changing point of view, and non chronological format, the film is generally categorized as one of many movies of varying quality that attempted to capture the style of Quentin Tarantino's Pulp Fiction. Leonard Maltin, who disliked the film, said that Go came off as a "junior Pulp Fiction."

However, unlike many of the films in the subgenre, the comparisons were mostly favorable, with Roger Ebert of the Chicago Sun-Times stating that "Go is an entertaining, clever black comedy that takes place entirely in Tarantino-land.... Go has energy and wit, and the performances are right for the material – especially Sarah Polley, who thinks fast and survives harrowing experiences, and Fichtner, the cop who is so remarkably open to new experiences."

Janet Maslin of The New York Times praised the performances of Olyphant and Fichtner, as well as Gos energy and Liman's direction: "Artfully executed druggy flights of fancy include a hallucinatory macarena in a supermarket, a mind-reading black cat and a smart visual approximation of how it feels to be on the verge of throwing up. Here and elsewhere, Mr. Liman manipulates speed, light, editing and point of view vigorously and keeps the radio humming. He creates a film that lives up to the momentum of its title and doesn't really need much more."

The film has endured as a cult classic, with critics continuing to review the film. In 2008, Joe Valdez of The Distracted Globe wrote, "Few titles have the finesse to sum up a movie as brilliantly as Go, a drug fueled rollercoaster ride that alternates between dark comedy and light suspense with terrific verve. The film's appeal lies in its modest scale and the fact that it was made mostly by starving artist types. ...Nearly everyone involved in the production was a relative unknown or newcomer. With no pressure to supply an entertainment to the masses, the writer, director and most of the actors deliver the best work of their careers."

In April 2014, Joe Reid of The Atlantic revisited Go on the 15th anniversary of its release. Reid noted that at the time it came out, it was seen as a "knock-off" of other 1990s films. "The split narrative style, complete with character title cards separating the film into thirds, put Go at the top of the list when it came to late '90s Tarantino influenced cinema. And then there was director Doug Liman, red hot off of the cult success of Swingers, trading neo swing culture for X and raves. (Both films would give a healthy chunk of attention to Vegas, though.) The thing about Go that sets it apart, however, is that it's COMPLETELY FANTASTIC. Energetic and quotable and stylish and neither overly enamored with nor overly dismissive of the culture it's inhabiting."

Soundtrack

Awards and nominations

In popular culture 
The Simpsons episode "Trilogy of Error" is, according to the writers' commentary, based on this film.

References

External links

 
 
 
 
 

1999 films
1990s crime comedy-drama films
1999 thriller films
American crime comedy-drama films
American LGBT-related films
1999 LGBT-related films
American thriller films
1990s English-language films
Films directed by Doug Liman
American anthology films
Bisexuality-related films
1990s chase films
Columbia Pictures films
Films about drugs
Films scored by BT (musician)
Films set in Los Angeles
Films set in the Las Vegas Valley
Films shot in Los Angeles
Films shot in the Las Vegas Valley
American independent films
1999 independent films
American nonlinear narrative films
Films with screenplays by John August
Hyperlink films
1990s Christmas comedy-drama films
1990s American films